The fourth season of the American comedy-drama television series Orange Is the New Black premiered on Netflix on June 17, 2016, at 12:00 am PST in multiple countries. It consists of thirteen episodes, each between 54–60 minutes, with a 77-minute finale. The series is based on Piper Kerman's memoir, Orange Is the New Black: My Year in a Women's Prison (2010), about her experiences at FCI Danbury, a minimum-security federal prison. The series is created and adapted for television by Jenji Kohan. 

The season received critical acclaim, again winning the Screen Actors Guild Award for Outstanding Performance by an Ensemble in a Comedy Series and Outstanding Performance by a Female Actor in a Comedy Series for Uzo Aduba, and numerous other awards.

Episodes

Cast and characters

Main cast

Recurring cast

Inmates

Production
The series was renewed for a fourth season on April 15, 2015, prior to its third-season premiere. For the fourth season, Jackie Cruz and Lea DeLaria were promoted to series regulars; with Elizabeth Rodriguez also being promoted by the season's sixth episode.

Reception

Critical reception
The fourth season received critical acclaim. On Metacritic, it has a score of 86 out of 100 based on 19 reviews. On Rotten Tomatoes, it has a 95% rating with an average score of 8.6 out of 10 based on 39 reviews. The site's critical consensus reads: "Orange is the New Black is back and better than ever, with a powerful fourth season full of compelling performances by the ensemble cast." James Poniewozik of The New York Times reviewed the fourth season as "Do you measure the quality of a TV season as a beginning-to-end average or by how well it ends? By the first yardstick, Season 4 is ambitious but uneven; by the latter, it's the series' best."

References

External links
 
 

Orange Is the New Black
2016 American television seasons